Isaac Walker Duffey (May 31, 1906 – April 4, 1967) was an American businessman and sports executive.  He organized a successful barnstorming team called the Anderson Chiefs, and later bought a National Basketball League franchise, which he named the Anderson Packers.  The Packers played in the National Basketball League for three years, winning the final NBL championship, and later spent time in the National Basketball Association and National Professional Basketball League.  Duffey was the interim coach of the Packers for three games in the 1949–50 season, going 1-2 before turning the reins over to former NBL coach Doxie Moore.

He, along with his brother John, was the founder and owner of the meatpacking company Duffey's Inc., owners of the Hughes-Curry Packing Co. of Anderson from 1946 to 1949.  Following his venture into basketball, Duffey was president of the Central Indiana Railway from 1951 until his death from cancer in 1967.

Duffey also attended Marion Normal College (now called Ball State University) in the 1920s.

References
 

1906 births
1967 deaths
20th-century American businesspeople
20th-century American railroad executives
Anderson Packers coaches
Anderson Packers
Ball State University alumni
Businesspeople in the meat packing industry
Deaths from cancer in Indiana
National Basketball Association owners
National Basketball League (United States) owners